Elisha Alphonso "Dale" Williams (October 6, 1855 – October 22, 1939) was a Major League Baseball pitcher. In 9 career games, he had a 1–8 record with a 4.23 ERA. He batted and threw right-handed.

Williams was born in Ludlow, Kentucky, and died in Covington, Kentucky.

External links

1855 births
1939 deaths
Cincinnati Reds (1876–1879) players
Major League Baseball pitchers
Baseball players from Kentucky
19th-century baseball players
Ludlow (minor league baseball) players